Lud-in-the-Mist (1926) is the third and final novel by British writer Hope Mirrlees. It continues the author's exploration of the themes of Life and Art, by a method already described in the preface of her first novel, Madeleine: One of Love's Jansenists (1919): "to turn from time to time upon the action the fantastic limelight of eternity, with a sudden effect of unreality and the hint of a world within a world".

Summary
Lud-in-the-Mist begins with a quotation by Jane Harrison, with whom Mirrlees lived in London and Paris, and whose influence is also found in Madeleine and The Counterplot. The book is dedicated to the memory of Mirrlees's father.

Lud-in-the-Mist'''s unconventional elements, responsible for its appeal to the fantasy readership, are understood better if they are analyzed in the context of her whole oeuvre. In this novel, the prosaic and law-abiding inhabitants of Lud-in-the-Mist, a city located at the confluence of the rivers Dapple and Dawl, in the fictional state of Dorimare, must contend with the influx of fairy fruit and the effect of the fantastic inhabitants of the bordering land of Faerie, whose presence and very existence they had sought to banish from their rational lives. When the denial proves futile, their mayor, the respectable Nathaniel Chanticleer, finds himself involved reluctantly with the conflict and obliged to change his conventional personal life and disregard the traditions of Lud-in-the-Mist to find a reconciliation.

Publication history
Whereas in the novels Madeleine and The Counterplot Mirrlees adapted elements from history, religions and literature, her use of a secondary-world setting in Lud-in-the-Mist associates it with the tradition of high fantasy, and thereby with its current popularity. In 1970 an American reprint was published without the author's permission, as part of the Ballantine Adult Fantasy series. According to that volume's introduction, Lin Carter, the series editor, could not locate the author. The book had fallen into the public domain in the United States as the copyright had not been renewed in 1954 or 1955, which was the statute at the time. It was reprinted subsequently by Orion Books in 2000 as part of their Fantasy Masterworks series.  A more recent republication by the Cold Spring Press includes a foreword by Neil Gaiman and an introduction by Douglas A. Anderson. A new edition from Prologue Books was published in 2013.

Reception
In a 1946 discussion of fantastic literature, Edward Wagenknecht referred to "Hope Mirrlees' unappreciated
masterpiece Lud-in-the-Mist".

David Langford and Mike Ashley describe Lud-in-the-Mist as "a moving book, shifting
unpredictably from drollery to menace to a high poignancy that sticks in the mind".

Neil Gaiman described Lud'' as "one of the finest [fantasy novels] in the English language.... It is a little golden miracle of a book." He described Mirrlees's writing as "elegant, supple, effective and haunting: the author demands a great deal from her readers, which she repays many times over." He says that it is one of his top ten favourite books.

Adaptation
Joy Wilkinson wrote an adaptation for BBC Radio 4, which broadcast on 30 October 2021. It starred Olivia Poulet, Richard Lumsden and Lloyd Hutchinson. Gaiman was cast as Duke Aubrey.

Notes

References

External links
 
 

1926 British novels
1926 fantasy novels
British fantasy novels
High fantasy novels
William Collins, Sons books